{{DISPLAYTITLE:C21H21N}}
The molecular formula C21H21N (molar mass : 287.39 g/mol) may refer to :
 Cyproheptadine, an antihistaminic/anticholinergic and antiserotonergic agent
 Naftifine, an allylamine antifungal drug for the topical treatment of tinea pedis, tinea cruris, and tinea corporis
 Tribenzyl-amine, a raw material used in the production of Rokitamycin

References